The Giferspitz is a 2,542 metres high mountain in the western Bernese Alps, overlooking Gstaad in the canton of Berne. It is the highest summit of the massif between Gstaad and Lenk, north of the Wildhorn. The summit can be accessed via a trail on the northern side.

References

External links
Giferspitz on Hikr.org

Mountains of the Alps
Mountains of Switzerland
Mountains of the canton of Bern
Two-thousanders of Switzerland